Monster Hunt 2  is a 2018 mainland Chinese-Hong Kong fantasy comedy adventure film directed by Raman Hui. It stars Tony Leung, Bai Baihe, Jing Boran, Li Yuchun and Tony Yang. A sequel to 2015's Monster Hunt, the film was released in mainland China and Hong Kong on February 16, 2018.

Plot
Wuba is on his own journey through monster realm. The darker forces of the evil monster king are in search for Wuba. Peace is not restored in the monster world. Wuba meets Tu and BenBen, a human-monster team, and they rescue Wuba multiple times. Meanwhile, Huo and Song are in search of Wuba and reach Monster Hunter Bureau. They upgrade their weapons and find new friends. In the end, all of them fight, rescuing Wuba from the evil monsters. Finally, Wuba is reunited with its family.

Cast
Tony Leung as Tu Sigu
Bai Baihe as Huo Xiaolan
Jing Boran as Song Tianyin
Li Yuchun as Zhu Jinzhen
Tony Yang as Yunqing
Huang Lei as Physician
Sandra Ng as Ying
Eric Tsang as Zhugao
Wu Mochou as Xiaobaozi
Song Xiaobao
Da Peng 
Liu Yan 
 X NINE

Production

Following the success of the first film, Edko Films upped the production phase of the sequel by doubling the number of visual effects shots, adding more monsters, building bigger sets, boosting merchandising output and marketing alliances, and adding veteran star Tony Leung to the cast.

Principal photography began in Beijing in October 2016. The film took three years to complete compared to the seven years taken by the first film.

The visual effects were rendered by half a dozen companies and required a multinational effort, Industrial Light & Magic and Whiskytree from the U.S., and China’s BaseFX in Beijing, Original Force in Nanjing, Trouper Visual Effects in Shanghai and CGCG in Taiwan.

Soundtrack

Marketing
Edko Films tied-up with many licensing partners for marketing the film. They partnered with Alibaba on merchandising, and with Chimelong, China’s largest domestic theme park, for developing theme park attractions inspired by the franchise. They also partnered with SM Supermalls, China's biggest mall. Moreover, Lionsgate is discussing Monster Hunt attraction in the Middle East.

Release
The film was released in China and Hong Kong on February 16, 2018 to coincide with Chinese New Year. It was screened at the 68th Berlin International Film Festival at the out-of-competition category.

At the 2018 Cannes Film Festival, Lionsgate acquired rights to its North American and UK theatrical distribution as well as rights to the property's location-based entertainment venues in select territories. The film was released day-and-date in North America along with its Chinese release. Lionsgate secured 70 screens there for its opening.

Reception

Box office

Buoyed by the groundbreaking success of the first film and its impact on China's cinema, its sequel was highly anticipated by audiences and was already envisioned to be a huge commercial success following the footsteps of its predecessor. Moreover, the film was released during the lucrative Chinese New Year period which aided the sequel in its continued success despite heavy competitions. In its hometown market, the film pre-sold around US$7.8 million tickets for its opening day (which later grew to RMB70.6 million or US$11.3 million fourteen days shy of release), seventeen days ahead of its premiere. By comparison, Journey to the West: The Demons Strike Back and The Mermaid hit that mark three and four days prior to their release respectively. At around 7:30 pm (GMT) of its opening day, ticket sales surpassed those of The Fate of the Furious to record the biggest opening day in the Middle Kingdom. On its full opening day, the film earned an estimated RMB545 million (US$85.9 million), setting a new single day box office record and occupying 44% of the market share. It is also the fourth biggest single-day in any territory behind the North American openings of Star Wars: The Force Awakens (US$119 million), its sequel, Star Wars: The Last Jedi (US$105 million) and Harry Potter and the Deathly Hallows – Part 2 (US$91 million). Including ticketing fees, the opening was worth RMB603 million (US$95.7 million), while others reported US$97 million. The Hollywood Reporter noted that had there been less to no competition, the film would've broken the all-time opening day record. The film topped the daily box office for two days but was eventually overtaken by Detective Chinatown 2 on its third day.

Earning a total of RMB1.14 billion (US$178.7 million) or US$190 million including online ticket surcharges, it broke a new all-time opening weekend in the country, topping Wolf Warrior 2s previous record, and securing 81% of the weekend total box office. An estimated US$7 million alone came from IMAX showings. The film along with the combined grosses of Detective Chinatown 2 (US$154 million), The Monkey King 3: Kingdom of Women (US$79.9 million), Operation Red Sea (US$70.3 million) and Boonie Bears: The Big Shrink (US$40.9 million) amounted to a record breaking RMB3.21 billion (US$506 million) or US$543 million weekend with online ticket sales, which is more than double the feat achieved in 2017 (US$205 million) and 2016 (US$224 million) during the same time period. The previous weekend record was set in North America during the weekend of December 18–20, 2017, when the combined grosses of several films resulted in US$306 million led by Star Wars: The Force Awakenss US$248 million debut. Moreover, the combined IMAX earnings of the three films also set a new record with US$15.1 million, led by Monster Hunt 2 and Detective Chinatown 2 (US$6.7 million).

In the United States and Canada, the film made US$120,000 on its opening day from 70 screens, and US$335,000 over its opening weekend.

Critical reception
The film received an average rating of 8.5 out of 10 by moviegoers on Maoyan.

Future
Hui and producer Kong have a story planned out through a fourth film. The two told The Hollywood Reporter in February 2018 that they plan to make an animated film after the fourth one which could serve as a potential spin-off.

References

External links 

Films directed by Raman Hui
Chinese sequel films
Films shot in Beijing
Hong Kong sequel films
Hong Kong fantasy adventure films
Films based on Strange Stories from a Chinese Studio
2010s adventure films
2010s Hong Kong films